Betty Ann Grubb Stuart (born February 26, 1950) is a retired American professional tennis player. She had her most significant success in doubles, including reaching the final of the 1977 US Open with Renée Richards as her partner.

Personal life
Stuart has been married four times. Her second husband was Ken Stuart. Her third husband was Australian tennis player Phil Dent, and she is the mother of American tennis players Brett Hansen-Dent and Taylor Dent. Her niece is professional beach volleyball player Misty May-Treanor.

WTA Tour finals

Doubles 7 (1/6)

References

External links
 
 

American female tennis players
1950 births
Living people
Sportspeople from Newport Beach, California
Tennis people from California
21st-century American women